Bedford Senior High School is a small public high school located in Bedford, Pennsylvania. It is part of the Bedford Area School District.

Extracurriculars
The district offers a variety of clubs, activities and sports.

Athletics
Bedford High School is a member of the Pennsylvania Interscholastic Athletic Association (District V), and plays in the Laurel Highlands Athletic Conference.
 Baseball
 Basketball
 Cross country
 Football
 Golf
 Gymnastics
 Soccer
 Softball
 Tennis
 Track and field
 Volleyball
 Wrestling

References

External links
 

High schools in Cumberland, MD-WV-PA
Public high schools in Pennsylvania
Schools in Bedford County, Pennsylvania